Polovina (also known as Polovinna, Polovino, Bolovino, Meelma, Palu, Salu) is a village in Setomaa Parish, Võru County in southeastern Estonia.

As of 2011 Census, the settlement's population was 13.

Meldova tsässon, a small wooden Seto chapel from 1753, is located in Polovina.

References

Villages in Võru County